The Frederick A. Miller House, or Broad Gables, is a historic house in the Wolfe Park neighborhood of Columbus, Ohio, United States. The house was listed on the National Register of Historic Places in 1985. It is a well-preserved example of early 20th century Tudor Revival houses. It was built in 1915 and designed by Columbus firm Richards, McCarty & Bulford in the Tudor Revival style.

The house was built for Frederick A. Miller, president of the H.C. Godman Co., the city's first and largest shoe manufacturer. At the time of its construction, he was the vice president and general manager of that company, co-founded by his father. Miller died in 1945, and his wife remarried, rarely used the house while living in New York, and sold it in 1950. From that year until 1983, the Monastery of Discalced Carmelite Nuns owned and occupied the building; afterward it became a private residence once again.

See also
 National Register of Historic Places listings in Columbus, Ohio

References

Houses completed in 1915
National Register of Historic Places in Columbus, Ohio
Houses in Columbus, Ohio
Houses on the National Register of Historic Places in Ohio
Tudor Revival architecture in Ohio